Maria Peale (1787 – 1866) was an American painter, primarily of still-lifes.

Life 
She was the daughter of James Peale, the niece of Charles Willson Peale and the sister of Margaretta Angelica Peale, Sarah Miriam Peale, and Anna Claypoole Peale, but unlike her sisters she never pursued an artistic career.  She only exhibited one painting, a still-life of vegetables; currently unlocated, it was shown at the Pennsylvania Academy of Fine Arts in 1811.  No works by her are known to be extant, although a Still Life with Oranges, Pansies, and Liqueur has been tentatively ascribed to her.  In the 1820s she and Margaretta assumed the responsibility of caring for their parents, freeing Anna and Sarah to pursue their careers.

References
The Peale Family: Creation of a Legacy: 1770-1870.  Lillian B. Miller, ed.  Abbeville Press, 1996.

1787 births
1866 deaths
19th-century American painters
American women painters
Maria
Sibling artists
Artists from Philadelphia
Painters from Pennsylvania
19th-century American women artists